Gorenje Zabukovje is a small settlement in the Municipality of Mokronog-Trebelno in southeastern Slovenia. It lies in the hills west of Trebelno in the historical region of Lower Carniola. The municipality is now included in the Southeast Slovenia Statistical Region.

References

External links

Gorenje Zabukovje on Geopedia

Populated places in the Municipality of Mokronog-Trebelno